Sukumar Bannerjee (25 June 1910 – 15 November 1938) was an Indian revolutionary from West Bengal. He is known mainly for his martyrdom while protesting against the British officers at the Raniganj Paper Mill.

Early life and career 
Sukumar was born on 25 June 1910 in Ballavpur estate of Raniganj. At the age of 22, he worked as an assistant secretary at the Raniganj paper mill.

Death 
On 15 November 1938, a British Officer in Raniganj Paper mill, in an attempt to break the non-cooperation movement there, was trying to harass the movement leaders, with the police officers. Sukamar tried to resist him and the British officer drove his lorry over Sukumar killing him instantly. He became a martyr in the cause of the non-cooperation movement in Raniganj.

Legacy 
Sahid Sukumar Bandhopadhay Sarani in Bidhannagar, Durgapur, West Bengal, is named after him.

References

 

Indian nationalists
Indian revolutionaries
1910 births
1938 deaths